Marienhof may refer to:

 Marienkhof, an air base in Kaliningrad Oblast, Russia
 Marienhof (TV series), a German soap opera
 Aert Jansz Marienhof (1626–1652), Dutch Golden Age painter
 Anatoly Marienhof (1897–1962), Russian poet, novelist and playwright
 Munich Marienhof station, a future station on the Munich S-Bahn
 Mariënhof, a former restaurant in Amersfoort, the Netherlands
 Villa Mariënhof, a historic mansion in Tilburg, the Netherlands